Fiesta Fiasco is a 1967 Warner Bros.-Seven Arts Looney Tunes cartoon directed by Alex Lovy. The short was released on December 9, 1967, and stars Daffy Duck and Speedy Gonzales.

Summary
Speedy Gonzales and his friends set up balloons and streamers for a fiesta. When they learn that Daffy Duck is approaching, they cease preparing and hide. When Daffy asks about the decorations, Speedy says that he does not see anything.

Daffy decides that the mice have planned a party and have chosen not to invite him. He then sets out on ruining their party. He builds a machine that creates a raincloud. Instead of raining on the mice, the cloud follows Daffy and causes him many problems. He is struck by lightning, he is caught up in a tornado and he is constantly rained upon (it's possible the raincloud had a will of its own and didn't want Daffy to ruin the preparations).

After suffering much torture from the raincloud, Daffy attempts to suck the cloud into a vacuum cleaner and release it over the mice's party. Failing to do so, Daffy ultimately lands inside what turns out to be his birthday cake and learns that the fiesta is really his surprise birthday party. As the raincloud reappears and begins raining over him, Daffy breaks into tears, touched by the mice's gesture. (In real life, 1967 marked the 30th anniversary of Daffy's debut.)

See also
 List of American films of 1967
 List of cartoons featuring Daffy Duck
 List of Speedy Gonzales cartoons

References

1967 films
Looney Tunes shorts
1967 animated films
1967 short films
Films directed by Alex Lovy
Daffy Duck films
Speedy Gonzales films
Animated films about mice
Films set in Mexico
Films scored by William Lava
1960s Warner Bros. animated short films
1960s English-language films